Vortex gun may refer to:
Vortex ring gun, an experimental non-lethal weapon that uses high-energy vortex rings of gas
Air vortex cannon, a toy that releases doughnut-shaped air vortices

See also
Vortex cannon (disambiguation)